The Turkey women's national under-19 volleyball team represents Turkey in international women's volleyball competitions and friendly matches under the age 19 and it is ruled by the Turkish Volleyball Federation That is an affiliate of International Volleyball Federation FIVB and also a part of European Volleyball Confederation CEV.

History

Results

Summer Youth Olympics
 Champions   Runners up   Third place   Fourth place

FIVB U19 World Championship
 Champions   Runners up   Third place   Fourth place

Europe U18 / U17 Championship
 Champions   Runners up   Third place   Fourth place

See also
 Men's
Turkey Men's national volleyball team
Turkey Men's national volleyball team U23
Turkey Men's national volleyball team U21
Turkey Men's national volleyball team U19
 Women's
 Turkey Women's national volleyball team
Turkey Women's national volleyball team U23
Turkey Women's national volleyball team U20
Turkey Women's national volleyball team U18

References

External links
 

National women's under-18 volleyball teams
V
Volleyball in Turkey
Women's volleyball in Turkey